Donald Rapo (born 4 October 1990) is an Albanian professional football player who plays as a left-back.

Club career

Burreli
In August 2014, Rapo moved to Kategoria e Parë club KS Burreli. He made his league debut for the club on 27 September 2014 in a 1–0 away loss to Besëlidhja. He played all ninety minutes of the match, receiving a yellow card in the 77th minute. He scored his first league goal for the club on 13 December 2014 in a match against the same side he made his debut against, Besëlidhja. The match ended 2–1 in favor of Burreli. His goal, scored in the 85th minute, made the score 2–1. He played all ninety minutes of the match.

Luftëtari
In Summer 2015, Rapo moved to then Kategoria e Parë side Luftëtari. He made his league debut for the club on 12 September 2015 in a 2–0 away victory over FK Dinamo Tirana. He was subbed on for Mustafa Agastra in the 67th minute. He scored his first league goal for the club came after their promotion to the Kategoria Superiore. It came on 22 December 2016 in a 2–2 home draw with FK Kukësi. His goal, scored in the 88th minute, made the score 2-2. He was subbed off three minutes later, being replaced by Brixhild Brahimaj.

Honours
Luftëtari
Kategoria e Parë (1): 2015–16

References

External links

Donald Rapo at FSHF

1990 births
Living people
Footballers from Tirana
Albanian footballers
Association football defenders
Albanian expatriate footballers
KF Olimpik Tirana players
KS Burreli players
Luftëtari Gjirokastër players
KF Laçi players
KF Drenica players
Kategoria Superiore players
Kategoria e Parë players
Kategoria e Dytë players
Albanian expatriate sportspeople in Kosovo
Expatriate footballers in Kosovo